Communist Party of India (Marxist–Leninist) Naxalbari was an underground Maoist political party in India. The party had its roots partially in the Maoist Unity Centre, CPI (ML) and partially in the group of Rauf in Andhra Pradesh.

MUC, CPI (ML) was formed when Kerala Communist Party and Maharashtra Communist Party merged in 1997. These two groups were surviving state units of the Central Reorganisation Committee, CPI (ML) (which was dissolved in 1991). CRC, CPI (ML) is also the group from which Communist Party of India (Marxist-Leninist) Red Flag broke away, after the Red Flag split in 1987 there was not much left of the CRC, CPI (ML).

Rauf was the leader of the small Communist Party of India (Marxist-Leninist) Red Flag unit in Andhra Pradesh. Large parts of the leadership of Rauf's faction were killed in police raids in the 1980s, and the group never recovered. Rauf had been pushing for an ultraleft line within Red Flag, and in 2000 he split. After the merger with CPI (ML) Naxalbari (formerly MUC, CPI (ML)) Rauf became the general secretary for the unified party.

CPI (ML) Naxalbari were members of Revolutionary Internationalist Movement (a Maoist 'international') and CCOMPOSA. The RIM-membership was inherited from CRC, CPI (ML), which was one of three founding organisations of RIM.

CPI (ML) advocated armed struggle and they only recognised groups such as Communist Party of India (Maoist) as truly communist.

On 1 May 2014 CPI (ML) Naxalbari merged with CPI (Maoist) and formed a single party, CPI (Maoist).

See also
 Coordination Committee of Maoist Parties and Organizations of South Asia
 List of Naxalite and Maoist groups in India

External links
Letter to Communist Party of India (Marxist-Leninist) Naxalbari

References

1997 establishments in India
2014 disestablishments in India
Communist Party of India (Maoist)
Defunct communist militant groups
Naxalbari
Far-left politics in India
Left-wing militant groups in India
Defunct Maoist organisations in India
Naxalite–Maoist insurgency
Political parties disestablished in 2014
Political parties established in 1997
Coordination Committee of Maoist Parties and Organisations of South Asia